Brian Scott Barber (born March 4, 1973) is an American former professional baseball starting pitcher, who played in Major League Baseball (MLB) for the St. Louis Cardinals and Kansas City Royals. He was drafted by the Cardinals in the first round of the 1991 amateur draft, and was later signed to a minor league contract. Barber threw and batted right-handed.

Barber was named the amateur scouting director of the Philadelphia Phillies, following the 2019 season.

Early life
Barber's hometown is Ocoee, Florida. He attended Dr. Phillips High School in Orlando, where he won the Gatorade High School Baseball Player of the Year in 1991. Barber elected to play professional baseball, rather than attend college.

Major league baseball career
At the age of 22, Barber made his MLB debut on August 12, 1995, with the Cardinals, making him the youngest player on the team, at that time. On that day, he pitched four innings, giving up three earned runs. Barber had a record of 2–1 and 5.22 earned run average (ERA). The following year, he pitched in only 3 innings, with an ERA of 15.00. Following the 1996 season, Barber found himself unhappy with the Cardinals, and on December 21, 1996, he was granted free agency. Two weeks later, Barber was signed by the Kansas City Royals. He missed the entire 1997 MLB season in the minors. In 1998, Barber re-emerged, pitching in 42 innings, while posting a 6.00 ERA. He also recorded a record of 2–4. The following year, Barber pitched in only 18.2 innings, with an ERA of 9.64, and a record of 1–3. On October 4, 1999, Barber was granted free agency again. About two months later, he was picked up by the Cleveland Indians. However, Barber would not pitch in an Indians uniform. Instead, he pitched the 2000 season for the Atlantic League Long Island Ducks, then retired.

Barber's career big league numbers included a 5–8 record, with a 6.77 ERA, 45 walks, and 59 strikeouts. He was 1 for 8 hitting, with a lifetime batting average of .125. Barber's lifetime fielding percentage was 1.000.

Post-playing career
Barber spent 18 seasons with the New York Yankees, in several off-field positions, including various scouting positions.

On October 22, 2019, Barber was named the Philadelphia Phillies’ amateur scouting director.

References

External links

1973 births
Living people
Baseball players from Ohio
Major League Baseball pitchers
St. Louis Cardinals players
Kansas City Royals players
Long Island Ducks players
Arkansas Travelers players
Johnson City Cardinals players
Louisville Redbirds players
Omaha Golden Spikes players
Omaha Royals players
Prince William Cannons players
Springfield Cardinals players
St. Petersburg Cardinals players
Dr. Phillips High School alumni